ECONned: How Unenlightened Self Interest Undermined Democracy and Corrupted Capitalism is a 2010 non-fiction book by Yves Smith, author of the Naked Capitalism blog. The book describes how the deregulation of the financial industry and the systemic incentives for managers to "loot" limited liability companies led to the build-up and eventual collapse of the credit bubble during the 2000s. Smith argues that free market economists hold much of the blame for the 2008 financial crisis due to their outsized (and unchecked) influence over policy makers. In particular, she takes issue with faux empirical approaches used by economists and the masking of complex social phenomenon in simple mathematical equations, based on assumptions that are openly acknowledged to be wrong or in error. The book makes the case that overreliance on the assumption of a 'self-correcting' free market led to a period of unregulated speculation, accounting tricks, and public looting.

References

 ECONned, at Palgrave Macmillan (official book site)

Finance books
2010 non-fiction books
Books about companies
Books about traders
Books about politics of the United States